Taylor Mesiti (born 22 March 1998) is a retired Australian rules footballer who played for North Melbourne in the AFL Women's (AFLW). Originally a basketballer, she was one of North Melbourne's 2018 signings for their expansion into the AFLW after playing football for the VU Western Spurs, the St Kilda Sharks and the Casey Demons. She had also represented Vic Metro at the 2016 AFL Youth Girls National Championships.

She debuted for North Melbourne in round 6 of the 2019 season against Collingwood at Marvel Stadium. In June 2020, Mesiti decided to step away from the game.

References

External links 

Living people
1998 births
Australian rules footballers from Victoria (Australia)
North Melbourne Football Club (AFLW) players